Hormesis is a characteristic of many biological processes, namely a biphasic or triphasic response to exposure to increasing amounts of a substance or condition. Within the hormetic zone, the biological response to low exposures to toxins and other stressors is generally favorable. The term "hormesis" comes from Greek hórmēsis "rapid motion, eagerness", itself from ancient Greek hormáein "to set in motion, impel, urge on", the same Greek root as the word hormone. The term 'hormetics' has been proposed for the study and science of hormesis.

In toxicology, hormesis is a dose response phenomenon to xenobiotics or other stressors characterized by a low-dose stimulation, with zero dose and high-dose inhibition, thus resulting in a J-shaped or an inverted U-shaped dose response (e.g. the arms of the "U" are inhibitory or toxic concentrations whereas the curve region stimulates a beneficial response.) Generally speaking, hormesis pertains to the study of benefits of exposure to toxins such as radiation or mercury (perhaps analogous to health paradoxes such as the smoker's paradox, although differing by virtue of dose-dependent effects). Microdosing, and to some extent homeopathy, are often regarded as applications of hormesis.

In physiology and nutrition, hormesis can be visualized as a hormetic curve with regions of deficiency, homeostasis, and toxicity. Physiological concentrations deviating above or below homeostasis concentrations adversely affects an organism, thus in this context, the hormetic zone is synonymously known as the region of homeostasis. In pharmacology the hormetic zone is similar to the therapeutic window. Some psychological or environmental factors that would seem to produce positive responses have also been termed "eustress".

In the context of toxicology, the hormesis model of dose response is vigorously debated. The biochemical mechanisms by which hormesis works (particularly in applied cases pertaining to behavior and toxins) remain under early laboratory research and are not well understood. The notion that hormesis is an important policy factor for chemical risk regulations is not widely accepted.

History
A form of hormesis famous in antiquity was Mithridatism, the practice whereby Mithridates VI of Pontus supposedly made himself immune to a variety of toxins by regular exposure to small doses. Mithridate and theriac, polypharmaceutical electuaries claiming descent from his formula and initially including flesh from poisonous animals, were consumed for centuries by emperors, kings, and queens as protection against poison and ill health. In the Renaissance, the Swiss doctor Paracelsus said, "All things are poison, and nothing is without poison; the dosage alone makes it so a thing is not a poison."

German pharmacologist Hugo Schulz first described such a phenomenon in 1888 following his own observations that the growth of yeast could be stimulated by small doses of poisons. This was coupled with the work of German physician Rudolph Arndt, who studied animals given low doses of drugs, eventually giving rise to the Arndt-Schulz rule. Arndt's advocacy of homeopathy contributed to the rule's diminished credibility in the 1920s and 1930s. The term "hormesis" was coined and used for the first time in a scientific paper by Chester M. Southam and J. Ehrlich in 1943 in the journal Phytopathology, volume 33, pp. 517–541.

Recently, Edward Calabrese revived the concept of hormesis. Over 600 substances show a U-shaped dose–response relationship; Calabrese and Baldwin wrote: "One percent (195 out of 20,285) of the published articles contained 668 dose-response relationships that met the entry criteria [of a U-shaped response indicative of hormesis]"

Examples

Carbon monoxide 
Carbon monoxide is produced in small quantities across phylogenetic kingdoms, where it has essential roles as a neurotransmitter (subcategorized as a gasotransmitter). The majority of endogenous carbon monoxide is produced by heme oxygenase; the loss of heme oxygenase and subsequent loss of carbon monoxide signaling has catastrophic implications for an organism. In addition to physiological roles, small amounts of carbon monoxide can be inhaled or administered in the form of carbon monoxide-releasing molecules as a therapeutic agent.

Regarding the hormetic curve graph:

 Deficiency zone: an absence of carbon monoxide signaling has toxic implications
 Hormetic zone / region of homeostasis: small amounts of carbon monoxide has a positive effect:
 essential as a neurotransmitter
 beneficial as a pharmaceutical
 Toxicity zone: excessive exposure results in carbon monoxide poisoning

Oxygen 
Many organisms maintain a hormesis relationship with oxygen, which follows a hormetic curve akin to carbon monoxide:

 Deficiency zone: hypoxia / asphyxia
 Hormetic zone / region of homeostasis
 Toxicity zone: oxidative stress

Physical exercise
Physical exercise intensity exhibits a hormetic curve regarding oxidative stress levels.

Individuals with low levels of physical activity are at risk for high levels of oxidative stress and disease, as are individuals engaged in highly intensive exercise programs; however, individuals engaged in moderately intensive, regular exercise experience lower levels of oxidative stress.

This relationship, characterized by positive effects at an intermediate dose of the stressor (exercise),  has been claimed to be characteristic of hormesis. Some evidence, however, indicates that the oxidative stress associated with intensive exercise may have long-term health benefits. This would imply that oxidative stress, itself, provides an example of hormesis (see section on Mitochondrial hormesis), but physical exercise does not.

Mitohormesis
Small amounts of oxidative stress may be beneficial.

Mitochondria are sometimes described as "cellular power plants" because they generate most of the cell's supply of adenosine triphosphate (ATP), a source of chemical energy. Reactive oxygen species (ROS) have been discarded as unwanted byproducts of oxidative phosphorylation in mitochondria by the proponents of the free-radical theory of aging promoted by Denham Harman. The free-radical theory suggests that the use of compounds that inactivate ROS, such as antioxidants, would lead to a reduction of oxidative stress and thereby produce an increase in lifespan. However, in over 19 clinical trials, "nutritional and genetic interventions to boost antioxidants have generally failed to increase life span."

ROS may perform an essential and potentially lifespan-promoting role as redox signaling molecules that transduce signals from the mitochondrial compartment to other compartments of the cell. Increased formation of ROS within the mitochondria may cause an adaptive reaction which produces increased stress resistance and a long-term reduction of oxidative stress. This kind of reverse effect of the response to ROS stress has been named mitochondrial hormesis or mitohormesis and is hypothesized to be responsible for the respective lifespan-extending and health-promoting capabilities of glucose restriction and physical exercise.

Whether this concept applies to humans remains to be shown, although recent epidemiological findings support the process of mitohormesis, and even suggest that some antioxidant supplements may increase disease prevalence in humans. In other words, antioxidants might not retard chronic degeneration, but rather, increase it, as observed in clinical trials.

Alcohol

Alcohol is believed to be hormetic in preventing heart disease and stroke, although the benefits of light drinking may have been exaggerated. The gut microbiome of a typical healthy individual naturally ferments small amounts of ethanol, and in rare cases dysbiosis leads to auto-brewery syndrome, therefore whether benefits of alcohol are derived from the behavior of consuming alcoholic drinks or as a homeostasis factor in normal physiology via metabolites from commensal microbiota remains unclear.

In 2012, researchers at UCLA found that tiny amounts (1 mM, or 0.005%) of ethanol doubled the lifespan of Caenorhabditis elegans, a roundworm frequently used in biological studies, that were starved of other nutrients. Higher doses of 0.4% provided no longevity benefit. However, worms exposed to 0.005% did not develop normally (their development was arrested). The authors argue that the worms were using ethanol as an alternative energy source in the absence of other nutrition, or had initiated a stress response. They did not test the effect of ethanol on worms fed a normal diet.

Methylmercury
In 2010, a paper in the journal Environmental Toxicology & Chemistry showed that low doses of methylmercury, a potent neurotoxic pollutant, improved the hatching rate of mallard eggs. The author of the study, Gary Heinz, who led the study for the U.S. Geological Survey at the Patuxent Wildlife Research Center in Beltsville, stated that other explanations are possible. For instance, the flock he studied might have harbored some low, subclinical infection and that mercury, well known to be antimicrobial, might have killed the infection that otherwise hurt reproduction in the untreated birds.

Radiation

Ionizing radiation

Hormesis has been observed in a number of cases in humans and animals exposed to chronic low doses of ionizing radiation. A-bomb survivors who received high doses exhibited shortened lifespan and increased cancer mortality, but at low doses, the ratios of cancer deaths in A-bomb survivors are smaller than those of Japanese averages.

In Taiwan, recycled radiocontaminated steel was inadvertently used in the construction of over 100 apartment buildings, causing the long-term exposure of 10,000 people. The average dose rate was 50 mSv/year and a subset of the population (1,000 people) received a total dose over 4,000 mSv over ten years. In the widely used linear no-threshold model (LNT) used by regulatory bodies, the expected cancer deaths in this population would have been 302 with 70 caused by the extra ionizing radiation, with the remainder caused by natural background radiation. The observed cancer rate, though, was quite low at 7 cancer deaths when 232 would be predicted by the LNT model had they not been exposed to the radiation from the building materials. Ionizing radiation hormesis appears to be at work.

Chemical and ionizing radiation combined
No experiment can be performed in perfect isolation. Thick lead shielding around a chemical dose experiment to rule out the effects of ionizing radiation is built and rigorously controlled for in the laboratory, and certainly not the field. Likewise the same applies for ionizing radiation studies. Ionizing radiation is released when an unstable particle releases radiation, creating two new substances and energy in the form of an electromagnetic wave. The resulting materials are then free to interact with any environmental elements, and the energy released can also be used as a catalyst in further ionizing radiation interactions.

The resulting confusion in the low-dose exposure field (radiation and chemical) arise from lack of consideration of this concept as described by Mothersill and Seymory.

Applications

Effects in aging
One of the areas where the concept of hormesis has been explored extensively with respect to its applicability is aging.

Since the basic survival capacity of any biological system depends on its homeostatic ability, biogerontologists proposed that exposing cells and organisms to mild stress should result in the adaptive or hormetic response with various biological benefits. This idea has gathered a large body of supportive evidence showing that repetitive mild stress exposure has anti-aging effects. Exercise is a paradigm for hormesis in this respect. Some of the mild stresses used for such studies on the application of hormesis in aging research and interventions are heat shock, irradiation, prooxidants, hypergravity, and food restriction.

Some other natural and synthetic molecules, such as celastrols from medicinal herbs and curcumin from the spice turmeric have also been found to have hormetic beneficial effects. Such compounds which bring about their health beneficial effects by stimulating or by modulating stress response pathways in cells have been termed "hormetins".

Hormetic interventions have also been proposed at the clinical level, with a variety of psychological stimuli, challenges and stressful actions, that aim to increase the dynamical complexity of the biological systems in humans.

Controversy
Hormesis suggests dangerous substances have benefits. Concerns exist that the concept has been leveraged by lobbyists to weaken environmental regulations of some well-known toxic substances in the USA.

Radiation controversy 

The hypothesis of hormesis has generated the most controversy when applied to ionizing radiation. This hypothesis is called radiation hormesis. For policy-making purposes, the commonly accepted model of dose response in radiobiology is the linear no-threshold model (LNT), which assumes a strictly linear dependence between the risk of radiation-induced adverse health effects and radiation dose, implying that there is no safe dose of radiation for humans.

Nonetheless, many countries including the Czech Republic, Germany, Austria, Poland, and the United States have radon therapy centers whose whole primary operating principle is the assumption of radiation hormesis, or beneficial impact of small doses of radiation on human health. Countries such as Germany and Austria at the same time have imposed very strict antinuclear regulations, which have been described as radiophobic inconsistency.

The United States National Research Council (part of the National Academy of Sciences), the National Council on Radiation Protection and Measurements (a body commissioned by the United States Congress) and the United Nations Scientific Committee on the Effects of Ionizing Radiation  all agree that radiation hormesis is not clearly shown, nor clearly the rule for radiation doses.

A United States-based National Council on Radiation Protection and Measurements stated in 2001 that  evidence for radiation hormesis is insufficient and radiation protection authorities should continue to apply the LNT model for purposes of risk estimation.

A 2005 report commissioned by the French National Academy concluded that evidence for hormesis occurring at low doses is sufficient  and LNT should be reconsidered as the methodology used to estimate risks from low-level sources of radiation, such as deep geological repositories for nuclear waste.

Policy consequences

Hormesis remains largely unknown to the public. Any policy change ought to consider hormesis first as a public-health issue (versus an industrial regulatory issue). This would include the assessment of the public concern regarding exposure to small toxic doses. In addition, impact of hormesis policy change upon the management of industrial risks should be studied.

See also
Calorie restriction
Michael Ristow
Petkau effect
Radiation hormesis
Stochastic resonance
Mithridatism
Antifragility
Xenohormesis

References

Further reading

External links
International Dose-Response Society

Homeopathy
Clinical pharmacology
Radiobiology
Toxicology
Health paradoxes